Jonathan Carlsbogård, (born 19 April 1995) is a Swedish handball player for FC Barcelona  and the Swedish national team.

He represented Sweden at the 2021 World Men's Handball Championship.

Honours

Club
DHB-Pokal
: 2020
Copa ASOBAL
: 2023
Supercopa Ibérica
: 2022
IHF Super Globe
: 2022

References

External links

Swedish male handball players
1995 births
Living people
Handball players from Gothenburg
Handball players at the 2020 Summer Olympics
Olympic handball players of Sweden
Expatriate handball players
Swedish expatriate sportspeople in Germany
Swedish expatriate sportspeople in Spain
Handball-Bundesliga players
Redbergslids IK players
FC Barcelona Handbol players
21st-century Swedish people